Alkmaar is a city and municipality in the Netherlands, located in the province of North Holland. Alkmaar is well known for its traditional cheese market. For tourists, it is a popular cultural destination. The municipality has a population of 111,766 as of 2023.

History

The earliest mention of the name Alkmaar is in a 10th-century document. As the village grew into a town, it was granted city rights in 1254. The oldest part of Alkmaar lies on an ancient sand bank a couple meters above the surrounding region; it afforded some protection from inundation during medieval times. Its vicinage consists of some of the oldest polders in existence. Older spellings include Alckmar.

On June 24, 1572, after the Geuzen captured the town, five Franciscans from Alkmaar were taken to Enkhuizen and hanged (martyrs of Alkmaar).

Siege of Alkmaar
In 1573 the city underwent a siege by Spanish forces under the leadership of Don Fadrique, son of the Duke of Alva. The citizens sent urgent messages for help to the Prince of Orange; he responded by promising to open the floodgates of the dykes and flood the region if the need arose, which despite the protestations of the peasantry, fearful for their harvest, he proceeded to do.

Some of his dispatches fell into the hands of Don Fadrique, and, with the waters beginning to rise, the Spaniards raised the siege and fled.  It was a turning point in the Eighty Years War and gave rise to the expression Bij Alkmaar begint de victorie ("Victory begins at Alkmaar"). The event is still celebrated every year in Alkmaar on 8 October, the day the siege ended.

Since the French Revolutionary Wars
In 1799, during the French Revolutionary Wars, an Anglo-Russian expeditionary force captured the city but was ultimately defeated in the Battle of Castricum. After that battle, on 18 October 1799, the two opposing sides held the Convention of Alkmaar which met to determine the fate of the defeated Anglo-Russian force. The French victory was commemorated on the Arc de Triomphe in Paris as "Alkmaer".

The North Holland Canal, opened in 1824, was dug through Alkmaar. In 1865 and 1867 the railways between Alkmaar and Den Helder and between Alkmaar and Haarlem were built respectively.

In the second half of the 20th century, Alkmaar expanded quickly with development of new neighbourhoods. On 1 October 1972, the town of Oudorp and the southern portions of Koedijk and Sint Pancras were added to the municipality of Alkmaar.

Administrative divisions

The municipality of Alkmaar historically consists of the following cities, towns, villages and districts: Alkmaar, Bergermeer, Daalmeer, De Hoef, De Horn, De Nollen, Het Rak, Huiswaard, Koedijk (southeastern part), Overdie, Oudorp and Omval. On 1 January 2015 the municipalities of Graft-De Rijp and Schermer were merged into Alkmaar. The historical village of De Rijp is thus since a part of Alkmaar.

These once separate villages are now all linked together by the suburban sprawl of buildings that arose between the late 1970s and early 1990s. During this time, the population of Alkmaar almost doubled.

Local government
The municipal council of Alkmaar consists of 39 seats, which are divided as follows after the 2022 elections:

 D66 – 5 seats
 OPA – 5 seats
 GroenLinks – 5 seats
 BAS – 4 seats
 VVD – 4 seats
 PvdA – 3 seats
 CDA – 3 seats
 Leefbaar Alkmaar – 3 seats
 Partij voor de Dieren – 2 seats
 Senior's Party of Alkmaar (Senioren Partij Alkmaar) – 2 seats
 FvD – 1 seat
 SP – 1 seat
 ChristenUnie - 1 seat

Transport

The A9 motorway runs from Amsterdam to Alkmaar, then continues on to Den Helder as the N9.

There are direct trains to Den Helder, Hoorn, Zaandam, Amsterdam, Utrecht, Ede, Arnhem, Nijmegen, 's-Hertogenbosch, Eindhoven, Maastricht and Haarlem. For exact details see Alkmaar railway station.

Alkmaar has two railway stations:

 Alkmaar
 Alkmaar Noord

The waterway Noordhollandsch Kanaal, which opened in 1824, runs through Alkmaar. . it can be crossed (among other ways) using two of the five operating vlotbruggen, Koedijkervlotbrug and Rekervlotbrug.

Main sights
Alkmaar has many medieval buildings that are still intact, most notably the tall tower of the Grote or Sint-Laurenskerk, where many people from Alkmaar hold wedding ceremonies. The other main attraction, especially in the summer months, is Alkmaar's cheese market at the Waagplein, one of the country's most popular tourist attractions.  The cheese market traditionally takes place from the first Friday in April through the first Friday in September. Every Friday morning (10:00–12:30) the Waagplein is the backdrop for this traditional cheese market. After the old-fashioned way of the hand clap, traders and carriers will weigh the cheeses. It is one of only four traditional Dutch cheese markets still in existence. The traditional fare of this cheese market is those cheeses made in the local area, as opposed to the well-known brands of Dutch cheeses, including the Edam and Gouda cheeses. It is not actually possible to buy cheese at the market itself, which is really only a demonstration of how this merchants' market operated in times gone by.  However, the demonstration, which takes place in front of the medieval weighing house, is surrounded by many specialized stalls where it is possible to buy all kinds of cheese (and non-cheese) related products. The Waag is also home to the local tourist office and a cheese museum. Alkmaar has 399 registered rijksmonuments, of which most are situated along the city's old canals.

Alkmaar has two large theatres and a big cinema (which was originally two cinemas). A red light district is situated at the Achterdam, and Alkmaar has a nightlife scene as well which takes place in the pubs in front of the cheesemarket. Every year, at the end of May Alkmaar hosts the four-day event Alkmaar Pride, which has a canal pride parade on Saturday.

Museums
 Beatles Museum – dedicated to The Beatles, as John Lennon's first guitar was made in Alkmaar
 Holland Cheese Museum – located in the historic weigh house
 National Beer Museum "De Boom"
 Op ArtMuseum
 City Museum Alkmaar  – for history of the city

Sports

Alkmaar is home to the professional football team AZ (Alkmaar Zaanstreek). In 2006, the club moved to a new 17,000 capacity stadium, the DSB Stadion, now named the AFAS Stadion. In 2008–2009, AZ won the Eredivisie, the Dutch football league. It was the second league title for the club after the Eredivisie in 1980/81 with only one league defeat. Notable coaches include former FC Barcelona coach Ronald Koeman, and Netherlands national football team coach Louis van Gaal.

The city also has a velodrome where the Dutch national track cycling championships are held every year. The city hosted the 2019 European Road Championships.

Notable residents

Public thinking & Public Service 

 Isaac Dorislaus (1595–1649) a Dutch Calvinist historian and lawyer  
 Jan Janse de Weltevree (1595 in De Rijp – ??) a Dutch sailor, the first Dutchman to visit Korea
 Cornelis van der Lijn (1608-1679) Governor-General of the Dutch East Indies 1646-1650 and elected Mayor of Alkmaar in 1668
 Bernard Nieuwentyt (1654 in West-Graftdijk – 1718) a Dutch philosopher, mathematician, physician and magistrate
 Anna Smitshuizen (1751–1775) the victim of a cause célèbre murder
 Kees Boeke (1884–1966) a Dutch reformist educator, Quaker missionary and pacifist
 Nicolette Bruining (1886–1963) a Dutch theologian, teacher and humanitarian in WWII
 Geertruida Wijsmuller-Meijer (1896–1978) a resistance fighter, saved Jewish children
Coenraad van der Molen, (1964-) successful business man and philanthropist. 
 Cornelis Berkhouwer (1919-1992) politician, President of the European Parliament 1973-1975
 Rudi Vis (1941–2010) British Labour politician, MP 1997 to 2010
 Jaap Pop (born 1941) a former Dutch politician, Mayor of Alkmaar 1988-1995
 Sybilla Dekker (born 1942) a retired Dutch politician and businesswoman
 Ronald Bandell (1946–2015) a Dutch civil servant, politician and Mayor of Alkmaar 1995-2000 
 Jos Punt (born 1946) bishop in the Roman Catholic Diocese of Haarlem-Amsterdam
 Patrick Cammaert (born 1950) a retired Dutch general and commander of UN peacekeeping missions

The Arts 

 Maria Tesselschade Roemers Visscher (1594-1649), poet and engraver
 Pieter van Schaeyenborgh (1600-1657), painter known for pictures of fish; worked in Alkmaar from 1635
 brothers Caesar van Everdingen (1616/7-1678) & Allaert van Everdingen (1621–1675)  Dutch Golden Age painters
 Emanuel de Witte (1617-1692) a Dutch perspective painter of genre paintings
 Willem de Fesch (1687–1761) a virtuoso Dutch violone player and composer
 Geertruida Bosboom-Toussaint (1812–1886) a Dutch novelist 
 Cécile de Jong van Beek en Donk (1866–1944) a Dutch feminist writer
 Dirk Smorenberg (1883–1960) a Dutch Art Deco painter
 Jan Wils (1891–1972) a Dutch architect and founding member of the De Stijl movement
 Jan Gerrit van Gelder (1903–1980) a Dutch art historian
 Ans Wortel (1929–1996) a Dutch painter, poet and writer
 Rudi Carrell (1934-2006) entertainer, hosted his own TV show 
 Dan van der Vat (1939-2019) a journalist, writer and military historian
 Angela Groothuizen (born 1959) a Dutch singer, artist and TV personality 
 Karin Bloemen (born 1960) is a Dutch actress and singer 
 Lorena Kloosterboer (born 1962) a Dutch-Argentine artist who paints using trompe-l'œil
 Joost Zwagerman (1963–2015) a Dutch writer, poet and essayist 
 Marco Borsato (born 1966) a Dutch singer 
 Edwin Brienen (born 1971) a Dutch film director, actor, producer and journalist 
 Hellen van Meene (born 1972) a Dutch photographer known for her portraits
 Tom Six (born 1973) a Dutch horror filmmaker, writer and actor 
 Roderick Teerink (born 1976) a Dutch-Argentine actor and music producer 
 Melissa Venema (born 1995) a Dutch trumpet player

Science & Business 

 Petrus Forestus (1521–1597) a prominent physician of the Dutch Republic 
 Adriaan Anthonisz (1527–1607) a mathematician, surveyor, cartographer, military engineer and burgomaster of Alkmaar
 Willem Blaeu (1571–1638) a Dutch cartographer, atlas maker and publisher
 Adriaan Metius (1571–1635) a Dutch geometer and astronomer 
 Cornelis Drebbel (1572-1633) a Dutch engineer, in 1620 built the first navigable submarine 
 Jan Leeghwater (1575 in De Rijp – 1650) a Dutch architect, mill builder and hydraulic engineer
 Joan Blaeu (1598-1673) a Dutch cartographer
 Adriaan Reland (1676 in De Rijp – 1718) a Dutch Orientalist scholar and cartographer
 Hendrik Willem Bakhuis Roozeboom (1854–1907) a Dutch chemist who studied phase behaviour in physical chemistry
 Alfred Peet (1920-2007) founder of American coffee retailer Peet's Coffee & Tea
 Jacob Gelt Dekker (1948 in Oterleek– 2019) a Dutch businessman, philanthropist and writer
 Marije Costerus Dutch scuba diver, UX professional and soccer enthusiast

Sport 

 Harm Ottenbros (born 1943) a former Dutch road bicycle racer, 1969 world champion
 Dick Quax (1948–2018) a Dutch-born New Zealand long-distance runner
 Hans Nijman (1959–2014) a Dutch former mixed martial artist and professional wrestler
 Richard Goulooze (born 1967) a Dutch former professional footballer with 351 club caps
 Michel Vonk (born 1968) a Dutch former professional footballer with 342 club caps
 Jakko Jan Leeuwangh (born 1972) a former speed skater
 Macha van der Vaart (born 1972) a Dutch field hockey player, team bronze and silver medallist at the 2000 and 2004 Summer Olympics 
 Steven de Jongh (born 1973) a Dutch former road bicycle racer
 brothers Yuri Cornelisse (born 1975) & Tim Cornelisse (born 1978) Dutch retired footballers with 371 and 445 club caps
 Jochem Verberne (born 1978) rower, team silver medallist in the 2000 Summer Olympics
 Maarten van der Weijden (born 1981) a Dutch long distance and marathon swimmer; Dutch Sportsman of the year 2008
 Theo Bos (born 1983) a Dutch road and track cyclist
 Wesley Harms (born 1984) a Dutch professional darts player
 Gago Drago (born 1985) an Armenian-Dutch welterweight kickboxer
 Dewi Claire Schreefel (born 1985) a Dutch female professional golfer on the LPGA Tour 
 Tom Büdgen (born 1985) a Dutch professional wrestler who previously worked in WWE, currently signed to All Elite Wrestling under the ring name Malakai Black
 Yvonne Hak (born 1986) a Dutch middle-distance runner, won gold at the 2010 European Athletics Championships
 Nycke Groot (born 1988) a Dutch handball player, 141 caps with the women's national team
 Joyce Sombroek (born 1990) a Dutch field hockey goalkeeper, team gold and silver medallist at the 2012 and 2016 Summer Olympics 
 Indy Dontje (born 1992) a Dutch racing driver

Twin towns—sister cities

Alkmaar is twinned with:

Gallery

References

Literature

External links
 
 
 
 Alkmaar's official Web site

 
Cities in the Netherlands
Municipalities of North Holland
Populated places in North Holland